The Free Burma Rangers (FBR) is a Christian multi-ethnic humanitarian service movement. Their main area of work is throughout Burma (also known as Myanmar) but concentrate primarily on the heavily forested border region, delivering emergency medical assistance to sick and injured internally displaced people (IDPs): a consequence of the long-running campaign of violence by the military junta, the State Peace and Development Council, against Burma's ethnic minorities.

FBR trains teams of men and women in frontline medical treatment and reconnaissance techniques. In addition to delivering humanitarian relief, a secondary role of the teams is to obtain evidence of military violence and human rights abuse. This information is then published in the form of online reports and/or released to larger international human rights groups, inter-governmental organisations such as the UN, and news agencies.

FBR is one of a number of grassroots organisations (see Mae Tao Clinic &  Back Pack Health Worker Team) that have emerged in response to the growing health needs of Burma’s persecuted ethnic underclass. FBR is not supported by either the Thai or Burmese authorities and their activity inside the Burmese border is clandestine.

Mission statement

History
FBR was formed in the late 1990s following an escalation of Burmese military activity against the Karen people. Villages were destroyed, people killed and more than 100,000 people forced from their homes in a program of violence that was designed to remove people from land to make way for developing business interests.

The history, character and ongoing activity of the Rangers is closely linked to its American founder Dave Eubank, who assumed the Karen pseudonym Tha-U-Wah-A-Pah ("TUWAP"). He is a Fuller Theological Seminary-educated pastor and ex-member of the U.S. Special Forces. Having already spent a number of years as a missionary in Burma, in 1996, following a chance meeting with Aung San Suu Kyi, the leader of the National League for Democracy, TUWAP was inspired to initiate a ‘Global Day of Prayer’ and help to strengthen unity between the majority Burman population and the various minority ethnic groups. TUWAP was then in Burma during the Army Offensives of 1997, distributing medicine to those displaced by the conflict, and it was during this time that he decided to employ his broad mixture of skills to bring a unique brand of humanitarian relief to a greater number.

In the words of the FBR leader, “[The situation in Burma] is a slow, creeping cancer, in which the regime is working to dominate, control, and radically assimilate all the ethnic peoples of the country.”

In January 2013, footage obtained by the Free Burma Rangers and released to the world's media was instrumental in stopping continued Burmese military offensives against the Kachin Independence Army in the north of Myanmar.

At least one FBR team was present at the liberation of Mosul, Iraq, in 2017.

FBR is a Christian organization. "The purpose of the Free Burma Rangers is to share the love of Jesus and to be His Ambassadors wherever we go," states Eubank on the FBR website.

FBR Teams
Every year about 15 multi-ethnic teams, including representatives from the Karen, Karenni, Shan, Arakan, Kachin and other ethnic groups complete the intensive Ranger training.
The training program is delivered with the help of other specialist organisations, including the Mae Tao Clinic and covers a diverse and comprehensive mix of practical relief, survival skills and socio-political awareness, including:

ethnic issues
ethics
conflict resolution
public health
first aid
advanced medical and basic dental care
human rights interviewing and documentation
reporting
counselling

Break down of full-time relief teams by ethnic origin

Overview of FBR relief operations since 1997

Total teams trained:   300

Relief missions conducted:  over 1,000

Patients treated:   over 550,000

People helped:    over 1,500,000

Fields of operation

FBR teams operate in conflict zones other than Burma, such as the conflict involving ISIS in Syria and Iraq.

Free Burma Rangers and Rambo
The film Rambo 4 was released worldwide in early 2008, with Sylvester Stallone continuing his role as the eponymous hero. In it, a fictionalised Burmese military played the role of the 'evil oppressors' and, although the film didn't make it to Burmese cinema screens, it became a huge underground success amongst the Burmese population. Research for the movie was obtained, in large part, from FBR field reports.

News and other related media
Mizara, S. 'Free Burma Rangers'. Stefania Mizara | photographer, photojournalist
Samuels, L., 2007.'Burma's other Struggle'. Newsweek, 5 October Burma Missionaries Fight for Ethnic Minorities

See also
 Burma Campaign UK

References

External links
 Free Burma Rangers
 Mae Tao Clinic
 Partners Relief and Development 

Medical and health organisations based in Myanmar
Christian advocacy groups